Kurtis Blow is the debut album by American rapper Kurtis Blow. It was released on September 29, 1980, by Mercury Records. The record includes the song "The Breaks", which was often sampled later in hip-hop records, mainly for its introduction made by Blow's a cappella vocal, and for the drum break, giving a wordplay dimension to the title. "Rappin' Blow, Pt. 2" was issued as a single that had a do-it-yourself B-side, the instrumental version. "Takin' Care of Business" is one of the first hip hop and rock ’n’ roll crossover attempts.

The album was placed at number 71 on The Greatest 80 Albums of 1980 by Rolling Stone magazine.

Track listing
Side one
 "Rappin' Blow, Pt. 2" (Kurtis Blow, Robert Ford, Miller, J.B. Moore, Larry Smith) 4:41
 "The Breaks" (Kurtis Blow, Ford, Moore, Russell Simmons, Smith) 7:41
 "Way Out West" (Moore) 7:40
Side two
 "Throughout Your Years" (Kurtis Blow, Moore, Waring) 5:17
 "Hard Times" (Jimmy Bralower, Moore, Russell Simmons, Smith, Waring) 4:36
 "All I Want in This World (Is to Find That Girl)" (Moore) 4:59
 "Takin' Care of Business" (Randy Bachman) 5:29
CD bonus tracks
 "Christmas Rappin'"  (Kurtis Blow, Ford, Moore) 3:57
 "Breaks [Instrumental]" (Kurtis Blow, Ford, Moore, Simmons, Smith) 5:52

Personnel

Musicians 
Vocals: Kurtis Blow, Sudana Bobatoon, Wayne Garfield, Sheila Spencer, William Waring, Adam White
Guitars: Eddie Martinez, J.B. Moore, Dean Swenson, John Tropea
Keyboards: Onaje Allan Gumbs, J.B. Moore
Bass: Craig Short, Tom Wolk
Drums: Jimmy Bralower

Production
Produced By Robert Ford & J.B. Moore
Engineers: Rod Hui
Assistant Engineers: Erik Block, Paula Stevens, Lisa Zimet
Mixing: Vincent Davis
Mastering: Suha Gur

References

1980 debut albums
Kurtis Blow albums
Mercury Records albums
Albums produced by Larry Smith (producer)